Saint Sixtus of Reims (died c. 300) is considered the first bishop of Reims.  According to Hincmar, a 9th-century archbishop of Reims, Sixtus was sent from Rome by Pope Sixtus II to Gaul to assist in Christianizing the region.  Another tradition makes him, anachronistically, the disciple of Saint Peter. 
According to tradition, Sixtus of Reims, along with his companion St. Sinicius (Sinice), established the Christian sees of Reims and Soissons.  Sinicius would later succeed Sixtus as bishop of Reims.  According to one source, “it would appear that Sixtus did not die as a martyr, despite the severity of the persecution during the era.”

References 

Bishops of Reims
Gallo-Roman saints
3rd-century Christian saints